Els Callens (born 20 August 1970) is a former professional female tennis player from Belgium.

Callens became professional in January 1990.
Her biggest achievement came in 2000 during the Summer Olympics in Sydney where she won the bronze medal in women's doubles, partnering Dominique Van Roost-Monami.

She retired on 26 October 2005, after losing her second-round match at the Gaz de France Stars tournament in Hasselt. She startet a comeback, and finally retired from professional tennis in 2011.

Nowadays, she works as sports commentator for the Belgian public broadcast Eén.

WTA career finals

Singles: 1 (runner-up)

Doubles: 22 (10 titles, 12 runner-ups)

ITF Circuit finals

Singles: 14 (11–3)

Doubles: 17 (10–7)

External links

 
 
 

1970 births
Living people
Belgian female tennis players
Belgian sports broadcasters
Flemish sportspeople
Olympic bronze medalists for Belgium
Olympic tennis players of Belgium
Sportspeople from Antwerp
Tennis players at the 2000 Summer Olympics
Olympic medalists in tennis
Medalists at the 2000 Summer Olympics
21st-century Belgian women